The Mātukituki River is a short braided river in the Southern Alps of New Zealand's South Island. Both its West Branch and East Branch originate from the Main Divide mountain ranges near Mount Aspiring / Tititea. Their largely glacier-fed waters each flow for approximately  before joining near Camerons Flat.  After this confluence, the Mātukituki River leaves the boundaries of Mount Aspiring National Park and continues for another  to exit into Lake Wānaka at the lake's southwestern edge.

Six glaciers feed tributary streams to the Mātukituki River, the largest being the Upper Volta Glacier, Rob Roy Glacier, Maud Francis Glacier, and the Avalanche Glacier.

From Camerons Flat onwards, the river is increasingly braided until it passes through a narrow gorge and under the West Wanaka bridge just before Lake Wānaka.

History 
Most of the Southern Alps started over 220 million years ago as sediment and rock on top of volcanic rocks on the seafloor. Intense heat and pressure consolidated the rock, and then uplifted it to form the Main Divide. The present landscape was shaped by glacial processes during the ice ages, when huge glaciers filled and scoured out the valleys.

The area around Mount Aspiring, called Tititea by the Māori, has a long history of Māori tribes coming from as far as Coastal Otago and the Foveaux Strait to the inland lakes to collect kākāpō, kererū, kākā and tūī from the forest. Moa would have also have lived along the forest edges for the first 200 years of Māori settlement.

The historic Māori iwi (tribes) of Kāti Māmoe and Ngāi Tahu both had named settlements around the shores of Lakes Wanaka and Hāwea, including Nehenehe on the northern banks of the mouth of the Mātukituki River, which they called "Mātakitaki". Ovens for cooking tī kōuka (cabbage tree) roots have been found at several sites on the lake shore.

The first European to see Mount Aspiring was government surveyor John Turnbull Thompson in 1857. The West Mātukituki Valley was explored by James Hector in 1862. Sheep and cattle farming began progressing up the valley in the 1870s.

Fauna and flora
Today, beech is the dominant forest in the Mātukituki Valley. Red beech prefers warmer valley sites, and is common just below Aspiring Hut. Silver beech grows increasingly towards the wetter, western end of the valley, while mountain beech dominates the drier, eastern end. The understory of the typically open forests supports a variety of ferns and mosses.

Insect-eating birds such as piwakawaka, tomtit and rifleman thrive in the beech forest, whereas the seed-eating kākāriki specifically prefers areas of red beech. Paradise shelduck thrive on the river flats, and in summer, spur-winged plover and oystercatchers are a common sight on farmland and along the drive from Wanaka.  The valley is also home to kea, whio, South Island robin, rock wren, the South Island long tailed bat, and several species of lizards.

Tourism
The Mātukituki River valley is home to a ski resort (Treble Cone), a jetboat operator (River Journeys) and numerous tramping (walking) trails providing access to landmarks such as the Rob Roy Glacier and the Dart Saddle. The unsealed Wanaka - Mount Aspiring Road follows the river's true right for most of its course, past the confluence of the East Branch and West Branch, and part-way along the West Branch to a Department of Conservation NZ car park at the Raspberry Creek shelter.

The most popular walk in the area is the Rob Roy Glacier walk, which leads up a side valley to a view point beneath Rob Roy Glacier.  The walking track crosses the Mātukituki River West Branch over a swing bridge.

References

External links

Rivers of Otago
Mount Aspiring National Park
Rivers of New Zealand
Tributaries of the Clutha River